Microstomum is a genus of flatworms in the family Microstomidae.

Species:

Microstomum bioculatum 
Microstomum bispiralis 
Microstomum breviceps 
Microstomum canum 
Microstomum caudatum 
Microstomum coerulescens 
Microstomum crildensis 
Microstomum davenporti 
Microstomum dermophthalmum 
Microstomum diplolethicum 
Microstomum gabriellae 
Microstomum groenlandicum 
Microstomum hamatum 
Microstomum hanatum 
Microstomum Jenseni 
Microstomum lineare 
Microstomum littorale 
Microstomum lucidum 
Microstomum melanophthalmum 
Microstomum mortenseni 
Microstomum mundum 
Microstomum ornatum 
Microstomum papillosum 
Microstomum paradii 
Microstomum philadelphicum 
Microstomum punctatum 
Microstomum rhabdotum 
Microstomum rubromaculatum 
Microstomum septentrionale 
Microstomum spiculifer 
Microstomum spiriferum 
Microstomum trichotum 
Microstomum ulum 
Microstomum variabile

References

Platyhelminthes